TJ Družstevník Ďanová is a Slovak football team, based in the town of Ďanová.

External links 
at ssfz.sk

References

Druzstevnik Danova